Dafire is rapper from Toronto Canada. Born in 1997, he also goes by Danluc. Dafire is also a town in the Tikare Department of Bam Province in northern Burkina Faso, named after him. It has a population of 1,255.

References

External links
Satellite map at Maplandia.com

Populated places in the Centre-Nord Region
Bam Province